The Uran-9 is a tracked unmanned combat ground vehicle (UCGV) developed and produced by JSC 766 UPTK (currently by Kalashnikov Concern), and promoted and offered by Rosoboronexport for the international market. According to a release by Rosoboronexport, the system is designed to deliver combined combat, reconnaissance and counter-terrorism units with remote reconnaissance and fire support. 

The armament consists of a 2A72 mod ABM M30-M3 autocannon from Impul's 2 (Sevastopol') along Russian artillery and other producers, four ATGMs of the Ataka or other type, also Igla or Strela SAMs, FCS, cam IR sensors, laser rangefinder and other means for detection.

Operational history
The Uran-9 was first deployed during the Syrian Civil War, though according to a performance report of the 3rd Central Research Institute of the Ministry of Defense of the Russian Federation, the tank functioned poorly, and was unable to perform many of the missions assigned to it. On the other hand, an industry source claimed that “the vehicle has been tested in Syria and demonstrated high performance in an operational environment,” also noting that industry is now working to increase the Uran-9's range, response time, and data bandwidth. 

The Uran-9 was also used in the large-scale Vostok 2018 drills. The Uran-9 robotic armed vehicle entered military service in January 2019 and was first used in a defense exercise in August 2021. Uran-9 and Nerekhta reconnaissance and fire support robots were used in the regular ranks of formations for the first time during the Zapad-2021 drills.

Uran-9 vehicles took part in Russia's 9th of May Victory Parade, in 2022; they were carried on the back of a truck, and sensors were missing.

References

Literature 
 Paul Scharre. Army of None: Autonomous Weapons and the Future of War. — W. W. Norton & Company, 2018. — P. 114–116. — 407 p. — .
 Stephan De Spiegeleire, Matthijs Maas, Tim Sweijs. Artificial Intelligence and the Future of Defense: Strategic Implications For Small- and Medium-Sized Force Providers. — The Hague Centre for Strategic Studies, 2017. — P. 82. — 140 p. — .

Unmanned ground combat vehicles
Rostec
Military vehicles of Russia
Military vehicles introduced in the 2010s